John McCain unsuccessfully ran for president twice:

 John McCain 2000 presidential campaign
 John McCain 2008 presidential campaign